Joseph (Yossi) Klafter (born May 7, 1945) is an Israeli chemical physics professor who is the Heineman Chair of Physical Chemistry at Tel Aviv University, and was the eighth President of Tel Aviv University from 2009 to 2019. He won the 2020 Israel Prize in the fields of Chemistry and Physics.

Biography

Joseph Klafter was born in Tel Aviv in Mandatory Palestine in 1945 to Slovak immigrant parents who came to Israel illegally in 1939 as part of Aliyah Bet. He attended elementary and high school in Rishon LeZion. Klafter obtained both a BSc and MSc in physics at Bar-Ilan University, and a PhD in chemistry at Tel Aviv University. He fought in the Six Day War. He then engaged in post-doctoral studies in chemistry at the Massachusetts Institute of Technology (MIT), and then worked in research and development at Exxon for eight years. 

He is a professor of chemical physics at Tel Aviv University. Klafter joined the Tel Aviv University Raymond and Beverly Sackler School of Chemistry in 1987, and became a full professor in 1989. He was the Gordon Chair in Chemistry from 1998 to 2003, and was named Heineman Chair of Physical Chemistry in 2003. From 2002 to 2009 he chaired the Israel Science Foundation

Klafter was the eighth president of Tel Aviv University, for two terms from 2009 to 2019, when he was succeeded by Ariel Porat. The previous president was Zvi Galil.

Klafter is the co-author of First Steps in Random Walks: From Tools to Applications (2011) and has published over 400 scientific articles and edited 18 books. 

In 2011, The American Academy of Arts and Sciences elected Klafter an honorary member. He is also a fellow of the American Physical Society. Klafter has won the Alexander von Humboldt Foundation Prize, the Weizmann Prize for Sciences, the Rothschild Prize in Chemistry, and the Israel Chemical Society Prize. He was awarded an honorary doctorate from Wroclaw University of Technology, Poland; the “Commander of the Order of the Star of Italy” distinction from the President of Italy; an Honorary Professorship of Tsinghua University, China; and an honorary doctorate from the Slovak Academy of Sciences.

Klafter  won the 2020 Israel Prize in the fields of Chemistry and Physics.

References 

Jewish chemists
Tel Aviv University alumni
Academic staff of Tel Aviv University
Presidents of universities in Israel
Humboldt Research Award recipients
Bar-Ilan University alumni
Living people
Fellows of the American Physical Society
1945 births
Israeli expatriates in the United States
People from Tel Aviv
ExxonMobil people
Israeli physical chemists
Israel Prize in chemistry recipients
Israel Prize in physics recipients
Israeli people of Slovak-Jewish descent